Xuzhou (徐州), also known as Pengcheng (彭城) in ancient times, is a major city in northwestern Jiangsu province, China. The city, with a recorded population of 9,083,790 at the 2020 census (3,135,660 of which lived in the built-up area made of Quanshan, Gulou, Yunlong and Tongshan urban Districts and Jiawang District not being conurbated), is a national complex transport hub and an important gateway city in East China. Xuzhou is a central city of Huaihai Economic Zone and Xuzhou metropolitan area. Xuzhou is an important node city of the country's Belt and Road Initiative, and an international new energy base. Xuzhou has won titles such as the National City of Civility (全国文明城市) and the United Nations Habitat Scroll of Honour award.

The city is designated as National Famous Historical and Cultural City since 1986 for its relics, especially the terracotta armies, the Mausoleums of the princes and the art of relief of Han dynasty.

Xuzhou is a major city among the top 500 cities in the world by scientific research outputs, as tracked by the Nature Index. The city is also home to China University of Mining and Technology, the only national key university under the Project 211 in Xuzhou and other major public research universities, including Jiangsu Normal University, Xuzhou Medical College, and Xuzhou Institute of Technology.

Romanization 
Before the adoption of Hanyu Pinyin, the city's name was typically romanized as Suchow or Süchow, though it also appeared as Siu Tcheou [Fou], Hsu-chou, Hsuchow, and Hsü-chow.

History

Early history 
The early prehistoric relics around Xuzhou are classified as Dawenkou culture system. Liulin site together with Dadunzi site, Huating site, and Liangwangcheng site correspond to the initial, middle and late stages of this culture, respectively. While the remains of sacrificial rituals performed to Tudi deity found at Qiuwan site and Gaohuangmiao site, both of them are in the outskirts of the city, indicate that Shang dynasty affected the area. History relates that Peng or Great Peng, the transitions from a tribe to a chiefdom contained within the boundary of the city. Peng Zu is believed to be the first chief, while the state was eventually conquered by King Wu Ding of Shang in around 1208 BC.

During the Western Zhou, a chiefdom called Xuyi or Xu rose and controlled the Lower Yellow River Valley. Allied with Huaiyi, Xuyi fought against Zhou and its vassals at irregular intervals. Since its declining, Xuyi once moved the capital to the area of Xuzhou and populated it with people who were migrated southwards.

Pengcheng, a city at the junction of the ancient Bian and Si Rivers, was founded by Lü (annexed by Song later). Chu took the city in the war of 573 BCE, but ceded the city back to Song in the next year, as a coercive measure.

Imperial China 
In 208 BC, Xiang Yu and Liu Bang pull their troops into Pengcheng, to where the Emperor Yi of Chu transferred his capital from Xuyi later, after Xiang Liang's death. The Emperor Yi was exiled to the southern China by Xiang Yu in 206 BC, the latter then proclaimed himself the Hegemon-King of Western Chu, and established his capital in Pengcheng too, until 202 BC.

During the Han dynasty, a new Chu Kingdom was established with its capital at Pengcheng. It was ruled by various imperial princes during the Western Han period (202 BC – 9 AD). Liu Jiao, the younger half-brother of Liu Bang, became the first Prince of Chu. In 154 BC, the prince Liu Wu participated in the Rebellion of the Seven Princes. However, he was defeated afterwards and Chu's territories were greatly diminished. By the end of the second century, a prosperous Buddhist community had been settled at Pengcheng.

At the turn of the second century, Pengcheng changed hands several times among Cao Cao and his rivals before being annexed to Cao Wei in about 200. In the intervening years, the seat of Xuzhou (Xu province) was transferred from Tancheng to Xiapi, which located in the northwest of Suining. While Pengcheng became the seat later than 220.

With the invasions of the Five Barbarians, considerable local households migrated to the south, a Liu clan from Pengcheng ascended to the gentry, its most well known descendant is Liu Yu, the Emperor Wu of Liu Song. Pengcheng was taken by the Northern dynasties later. Liu Yu recaptured the lost territory in the north of the Huai River in about 408. Xuzhou was divided into two parts: Beixuzhou (North Xuzhou) and Xuzhou (with Jingkou as its seat) in 411. North Xuzhou whose seat was Pengcheng bounded on the south by the Huai River. Beixuzhou was restored as Xuzhou a decade later, while its south counterpart was renamed Nanxuzhou (South Xuzhou). Since then, Pengcheng remained being the seat of Xuzhou until it was eliminated in the early Ming.

The raging wars inflicted upon Xuzhou until the Emperor Taizong of Tang's enthronement in 626. Keeping the northern rebellions and warfare a distance gave Xuzhou scope for developing during the most period of the Tang dynasty. According to the Old Book of Tang and the New book of Tang, in 639, the total population of Pengcheng County, Fei County and Pei County was only 21,768, versus 205,286 in 742.

In 781, Li Na  marched south to besiege Xuzhou. Although his revolt was quell soon, the halt of the transport by the Bian Canal impelled the court to secure the area.

The then prefect of Xuzhou, Zhang Jianfeng was designated as the first military governor of Xuzhou–Sizhou–Haozhou which was headquartered in Xuzhou since 788. The title was restored and renamed Wuning in 805, after an interval of five years. Wang Zhixing, another military governor of Wuning, established several battalions (the most notorious one among is the Silver Sword) in the Army specifically for select recruits. These soldiers not only defy military discipline but also show defiant towards the successors to Wang. In 832, Li Ting received a threatening letter prior to his induction in there, made him resigned immediately. Then Wuning suffered mutinies in 849, 859 and again in 862. Another two governors were expelled. Wang Shi  was appointed, under the circumstances. He put the mutiny down by executing part of the garrison troops and disbanded the rest, which became thugs and loot later. In 864, the court declared an amnesty in the area, and promised that all thugs who willingly re-enrolled would be sent for a tour of duty in the southern, and then, presumably, returned to regular army service in the north.

Three thousand men surrendered and were sent to the south to join the two thousand former Wuning soldiers there. The breached pledge irritated them. Led by Pang Xun, some soldiers mutinied and marched back north. They have unimpeded access to the area by the winter of 868. The local civil governor refused Pang's demand to have the hatred officers removed, and a military confrontation ensued. Thousands of local peasants joined the rebels. They took the prefectural city of Xuzhou, captured the civil governor, and killed those officers. Pang acquired a considerable following. Still, the rebellion was suppressed a year later eventually. Wuning was renamed Ganhua with admonishment on lest the garrison to revolt again.

After the Yellow River began to change course during the Song dynasty, heavy silting at the Yellow River estuary forced the river to channel its flow into the lower Huai River tributary. The area became barren thereafter due to persistent flooding, nutrient depletion and salination of the once fertile soil.

In the first month of 1129, Nijuhun took the city after a siege of 27 days, and the then governor Wang Fu was executed for refusing to submit. Wang's inferior Zhao Li rallied the remains and constructed a local militia. They recaptured the city two months later but withdrew from there strategically soon. Henceforth, Xuzhou was ruled by Jurchen over a century.

In 1232, the general Wang You, Feng Xian revolted, they expelled the Jurchen's governor Tuktan. Then the Mongolian army led by Anyong, a Han Chinese general captured Xuzhou soon. Both the general of the state of Su Liu Anguo and the general of Pizhou Du Zheng yielded their owned city to Anyong. Regarding Anyong's behave as grabbing reputation, the Mongolian general Asuru irritated and persisted to kill him. Felt panic, Anyong sought refuge from Jurchen. The Jin Dynasty resumed its ruling in Xuzhou, and it was quite transient. The serious disunity made betraying recur. In November 1233, the garrison of Xuzhou welcomed the Mongolian. Meantime, Anyong pledged loyalty to the Song Dynasty. He captured the city again after the Mongolian army left. In the spring of the next year, the Mongolian commander Zhang Rong attacked Xuzhou, Anyong drowned himself after the final defeat. The Mongolian governor of Xuzhou and Pizhou called Li Gaoge surrendered to the Song in 1262. Then he failed and was killed after several days.

A rebellion against Yuan rose by Li Er who was nicknamed Sesame Li in the area around Xuzhou.  In the eighth month of 1351, they took the city. Toghon Temür gave an edict that they would be granted amnesty if they surrendered to the authority, in the spring of the next year. The rebels ignored that, so he agreed that Toqto to suppress the unrest. The city fell in the autumn, and the multitudes were killed by Toqto's army afterwards. It may be the symbolically most important victory for Toqto. Thus, Xuzhou was renamed Wu'an (literal meaning: Restoring peace by force") as a favour for him, and a stone slab celebrating his deed was erected by the court in the city.

Zhang Shicheng occupied Xuzhou as the northernmost city of his domain in 1360. The Ming forces under Xu Da , captured Xuzhou in 1366. Soon Köke Temür sent an army under General Li Er to attack Xuzhou. Fu Youde and Lu Ju who held the city raided them outside, most of the enemy were drowned while the remained about 270 soldiers and 500 horses were captured.

Xuzhou had a long period of prosperity during the Ming dynasty. The flourishness largely attributed to the carriage, especially by the Grand Canal, one of seven customs barriers (or customs houses) under the Ministry of Revenue was located in Xuzhou. It was retained until the late Qing. Korean Choe Bu affirmed that the city where he travelled by way of, hardly pale by comparison to the Jiangnan region.

As a hub for both the national courier system and the grain tribute system for several centuries, Xuzhou was of vital importance. Thus, the government of Ming established three garrison areas namely guards in the present-day area: Xuzhou guard, Xuzhou Left guard and Pizhou guard for its security.

Yet, the local navigation was considerably constrained by two Rapids: the Xuzhou Rapids, a kilometer southeast of the city, and the Lüliang Rapids, another 24 kilometers further south. The remedy provided by the Ministry of Works is constructing the Jia Canal, which paralleled the treacherous stretch of Xuzhou. However, the canal completed in the 1600s ravaged the city. Not only it disrupted the former drainage system, but also depressed the local economy. Prior to the recession, flooding and the famines followed struck Xuzhou frequently. The worst flooding occurred in 1624:  it was immersed up to 1 zhang and 3 chi  (about 4m) within the city.

After the Hongguang Emperor enthroned in Nanjing, the court designated four defense areas along the southern bank of the Yellow River to repulse the Qing armies. While the former bandit general, Gao Jie was designated to take the crucial forward position at Xuzhou by Shi Kefa.  But the assassination of Gao seriously reduced the court's capacity to deal with challenges from Qing. Gao's successor was Li Chengdong. Being aware of forthcoming attack, Li deserted Xuzhou in the early summer of 1645. Then Dodo's army captured the city.

The seismic activity of the Tancheng earthquake in 1688  was also involved Xuzhou. "More than half the houses of the city were ruined" and "led to enormous deaths", according to the gazetteer.

In the 1850s, the Yellow River shifted its course from the southern to the northern side of the Shandong peninsula, the process caused serious floods and famine in Xuzhou, and almost made the waterway system within the prefecture defunct.

Modern China 

Zhang Xun and his remaining army fled to Xuzhou after the Revolution of 1911. They entered the city on 5 December. The Nanking Government sent three armies to attack Xuzhou. In the middle of February 1912, Zhang evacuated the city and moved north after he was defeated.

Since the Second Revolution began, Xuzhou became a front-line city. The Revolutionary Army fared badly as it advanced from there towards the north, and a rout ensued. Then the Beiyang Army captured the city on 24 July. Thereafter, Zhang Xun made Xuzhou his base. he convened four meetings of the Beiyang leadership. Involved the stalemate among Li Yuanhong and Duan Qirui in 1917, he marched on Beijing with a troop in June. His failure spread and caused a terrible wave of theft and arson committed by his garrisons later in Xuzhou in July.

The Zhili clique dominated Xuzhou by 1924. In the autumn of this year, the Second Zhili–Fengtian War broke out, Zhang Zongchang who supported the Fengtian clique seized the city with his thirty thousand soldiers. Sun Chuanfang led a coalition of forces to sortie the Fengtian Army in October 1925. They occupied the city on 8 November. As the leader of the Northern Expedition, Chiang Kai-shek arrived in Xuzhou on 17 June 1927. He conferred with Feng Yuxiang and other Kuomintang officers on 20 June, Feng was courted by Nanjing. Then Sun Chuanfang and Zhang Zongchang began to fight in unison against the Nationalist government. They captured the city on 24 June. The fall of Xuzhou aroused public outrage, Chiang 's first resignation ensued. On 16 December, Nanjing force took the area again.

The area was the main site both of the Battle of Xuzhou in 1938 against the Japanese Army in the Second Sino-Japanese War and of the battle in the Chinese Civil War, the Huaihai Campaign in 1948–49.

On 19 May 1938, Chiang gave the order to abandon Xuzhou, then Japanese military took control of the city.

The Administrative Commission of the Su-Huai Special Region was established in January 1942, with its seat at Xuzhou. It was replaced by a new puppet province, Huaihai. Hao Pengju was appointed as the governor.

After the Second Sino-Japanese War, the troop under He Zhuguo entered Xuzhou on 6 September. The Xuzhou Pacification Commission was founded in the end of year, and Gu Zhutong was appointed as the Chief. It was disbanded when the Army Command Headquarters of transferred to Xuzhou on 5 March 1947. Meantime, a military tribunal attached to the commission was organized to sentence 25 Japanese soldiers.

Guo Yingqiu as the representative of the CPC went to Xuzhou to negotiate a regional truce, since 10 February 1946. On 2 March, the "Committee of Three", comprising George Marshall, Zhang Zhizhong and Zhou Enlai arrived for the ceasefire in Central China. Still, the KMT and the CPC came into conflict soon. The CPC revealed that Yasuji Okamura assisted the KMT in the local warfare against the PLA.

The Huaihai was the a critical of the trinity of the major campaigns during the Chinese Civil War. Fighting centred around the city of Xuzhou, seat of the Bandit Suppression Headquarters established on 6 June 1948. It turned into a fiasco, which led to the fall of the Nationalist Chinese capital Nanjing. The CPC controlled the city on 1 December.

Then Xuzhou (the old urban area) was made a part of Shandong province temporarily, together with the rest area of the northern Jiangsu along the Longhai Railway. The city was returned to Jiangsu as the province was restored in 1953.

The railways in Xuzhou bore the brunt of the transporting muddle in the 1970s, Beijing was concerned with the issue in 1974. Thus, the then Minister of Railways, Wan Li went to Xuzhou to inspect and rectify in March. It was deemed as a breakthrough on restoring order later.

On April 22, 1993, Xuzhou was ratified as a "Larger Municipality" with legislative power by the State Council.

Administration

The evolutionary history

The present administrative division 
The prefecture-level city of Xuzhou administers ten county-level divisions, including five districts, two county-level cities and three counties.
These are further divided into 161 township-level divisions, including 63 subdistricts and 98 towns.

Geography 

Xuzhou is of strategic importance for linking South China and North China. The boundaries of its jurisdiction are adjacent to Lianyungang and Suqian in east; Suzhou of Anhui province to the south; Huaibei to the west; Linyi, Zaozhuang, Jining and Heze of Shandong province to the north.

The area can be divided into four sectors from east to west, constitute the Shandong–Jiangsu Traps, the Tancheng–Lujiang Fault Zone, the Xu–Huai Downwarp-fold Belt and the Fault-block of West Shandong respectively. Most of the area is located in the Xu-Huai Alluvial Plain, the southeast part of the North China Plain.

The confluence of the former Si River and the former Bian Canal, situated off the ancient Xuzhou city north-eastwards. The city and its hinterland were the areas liable to severe flooding by the Yellow River since the tenth century. In 1194, the river changed its course to join the Si River, the former tributary of the Huai. From then on, it flowed along the north of the walled city until 1855. The city proper is bisected by its ancient course nowadays, while the Yunlong Lake is located in the southwest. North of the lake is Yunlong Park.

Climate 
Xuzhou has a monsoon-influenced humid subtropical climate (Köppen Cwa), with cool, dry winters, warm springs, long, hot and humid summers, and crisp autumns. Snow may occur during winter, though rarely heavily. Precipitation is light in winter, and a majority of the annual total of  occurs from June thru August. With monthly percent possible sunshine ranging from 44% in July to 54% in three months, the city receives 2,221 hours of bright sunshine annually.

Demographics 
According to the 1% National Population Sample Survey in 2015, the total resident population of Xuzhou reached 8.66 million, and the sex ratio was 101.40 males to 100 females.

Economy 
Historically, Xuzhou and the surrounding regions were a predominantly agricultural area. Its arable land was severely depleted by the changes in the course of the Yellow River since the mid 11th century, and the drought-resistant crops: wheat, sorghum, soybean, maize and potato, became the local staples. Besides, cotton, peanut, tobacco and sesame also grew in low-yield. The local mining traces it origins to an iron mine, Liguo. It was exploited since Han dynasty, and managed by a particular bureau in Song. And the city had major coal reserves of the province. Local coaling began by the 1070s, according to a lyric of the then governor Su Shi. Copper smelting in this area supposedly started in the Three Kingdoms era.

The city astride the old course of the Grand Canal had been through several transitory periods of prosperity, before the grain tribute system was abolished in 1855. It remained being economically backward in the 1940s for wars, and a few people engaged in industrial sectors.

Later the CPC positioned the city as a region of coal mining and heavy industry. Its dominant sectors are machinery, energy and food production nowadays. The construction machinery manufacturer XCMG is the largest company based in Xuzhou. It was the world's tenth-largest construction equipment maker measured by 2011 revenues, and the third-largest based in China (after Sany and Zoomlion).

Education 
Xuzhou was a regional centre for education, but two defunct institutions once chose their sites within the city: Provincial College of Kiangsu and North China Theological Seminary. In the 1950s, the then Jiangsu Normal Academy relocated to the city in 1958, and the then Nanjing Medical College, Xuzhou was founded later, both survived the Great Leap Forward. In 1978, the then China Institute of Mining and Technology relocated to Xuzhou.

Schools 
 Xuzhou No.1 Middle School
 Xuzhou No.2 Middle School
 Xuzhou No.3 Middle School
 Xuzhou Senior High School
 Xuzhou No.5 Middle School 
 Xuzhou No.36 Middle School
 Xuzhou No.13 Middle School

Universities and colleges
 China University of Mining and Technology
 Jiangsu Normal University
 Xuzhou Medical University
 Xuzhou Institute of Technology
 People's Liberation Army Air Force Logistical College

Religion 

According to the local administrator's survey in 2014, around 4.76% of the population of Xuzhou, namely 0.46 million people belongs to organised religions. The largest groups being Protestants with 350,000 people, followed by Buddhists with 70,000 people.

Xuzhou is deemed one of earlier Buddhist centres in China supposedly because the Emperor Ming of Han mentioned that the then Prince of Chu Liu Ying built a "temple for Buddha".

The local Catholic activities were dominated by the French-Canadians of the Society of Jesus since the 1880s, and there were 73,932 adherents and seventeen churches in 1940. Cathedral of the Sacred Heart of Jesus, completed in 1910, is still a principal church nowadays. While the initial Protestant mission in Xuzhou was led by Alfred G. Jones of BMS, then American Southern Presbyterian Mission took over it in the 1890s.

Culture

Arts 
According to Xu Wei's Nanci Xulu ([Treatises and Catalogue of Nanqu]), Yuyao Tone, one of then major Southern Operas, was prevalent in Xuzhou during the Mid-Ming period. Shanxi merchants popularized Bangzi in Xuzhou afterwards, since it was introduced in the late Ming along the Great Cannel. Fused the local ballads in dialect, this localized version evolved into a new opera over the following centuries. The opera was designated as Jiangsu Bangzi in 1962.

The new municipal concert hall was opened in 2011, shaped like a myrtle flower. However, the various regular performances are unattainable. While the first local philharmonic orchestra is established in 2015.

Media 
The first local newspaper entitled Hsing-hsü Daily was started in 1913. Nowadays, Xuzhou's major newspaper is Xuzhou Daily, which was founded in the end of 1948. It is owned and operated by the Xuzhou Committee of the Chinese Communist Party.

 

The earliest local radio was broadcasting in 1934 for public education. Then Japanese military founded  in 1938, after the city was captured. The National Army took over it after World War II. Broadcasting was resumed in 1949, operated by the CPC. In 1980, Xuzhou TV Station was established. A decade later, Xuzhou TV Tower was completed.

Museums 
Xuzhou Museum
Xuzhou Decree Museum
Museum of Terra Cotta Warriors and Horses of The Han Dynasty

Dialect 
As a subdialect of Central Plains Mandarin, Xuzhou dialect is spoken in the whole area, especially in the suburb and countryside.

Cuisine 

Xuzhou cuisine is closely related to Shandong cuisine's Jinan-style. Xuzhou's most well known foods include bǎzi ròu (pork belly, and other items stewed in a thick broth), sha tang, and various dog meat dishes.

Another one of Xuzhou's famous dishes is di guo style cooking which places ingredients with a spicy sauce in a deep black skillet and cooks little pieces of flatbread on the side or top. Common staples of di guo style cooking include chicken, fish, lamb, pork rib and eggplant.

Fu Yang Festival is a traditional festival celebrated in the city. It starts on Chufu which is around mid-July and lasts for about one month. During the festival, people eat lamb meat and drink lamb soup. This festival is very popular among all the citizens.

Transport system

Roads 
Xuzhou has many urban expressways: Xuzhou 3rd Ring Road expressways (east, north and west), Xuzhou East Ave. expressway, Xuzhou-Pantang expressway, Xuzhou-Jiawang expressway and Xuzhou-Suqian expressway etc.

Xuzhou is the sixth city which has a fifth Ring Road in China, and is the only city in Jiangsu which has a fifth Ring Road.

Expressways 
 G2 Beijing–Shanghai Expressway
 G2513 Huai'an–Xuzhou Expressway
 G3 Beijing–Taipei Expressway
 G30 Lianyungang–Khorgas Expressway
 S49 Xinyi–Yangzhou Expressway
 S65 Xuzhou–Mingguang Expressway
 S69 Jinan–Xuzhou Expressway

National Highways 
 China National Highway 104
 China National Highway 205
 China National Highway 206
 China National Highway 311

Rail 
Xuzhou is an important railway hub, where two major passenger stations: Xuzhou Railway Station and Xuzhou East Railway Station (Xuzhoudong Railway Station) are situated in. Xuzhou Railway Station is at the intersection of Jinghu Railway and Longhai Railway. While Xuzhou East Railway Station on the eastern outskirts is the junction of the Beijing–Shanghai and Xuzhou–Lanzhou high-speed railways. Xuzhou is the only city which has three huge railway stations (Xuzhou Railway Station, Xuzhoudong Railway Station and Xuzhoubei Railway Station) in Jiangsu Province.

Aviation 
Xuzhou Guanyin International Airport is one of the three biggest international airports in Jiangsu Province, it serves the area with scheduled passenger flights to major airports in China. Xuzhou Guanyin International Airport has two terminals until 2019. Domestic Terminal (Terminal 2) and International Terminal (Terminal 1).

Xuzhou Metro System 
Xuzhou Metro (or ) is the first subway in North Jiangsu. The project was approved by State Council in 2013. Three subway lines are being built and expected to be completed by 2019-2021 one after another, with total length of 67 km and 3 transfer stations: Pengcheng Square Station (Change for Metro Line 1 and Line 2), Xuzhou Railway Station (Change for Metro Line 1 and Line 3) and Huaita Station (Change for Metro Line 2 and Line 3).

Metro Line 1 (From Xuzhoudong Railway Station to Luwo Station via Xuzhou Railway Station and Pengcheng Square Station) was opened on 28 September 2019, Metro Line 2 (From North Passenger Station to Xinchengqu East Station via Pengcheng Square Station and Jiangsu Normal University Yunlong Campus) has been opened for operation on November 29, 2020, and Metro Line 3 (Phase 1) (From Xiadian Station to Gaoxinqu’nan Station via Xuzhou Railway Station and China University of Mining and Technology Wenchang Campus and Jiangsu Normal University Quanshan Campus)() has been used for service since June 29, 2021. At the same time, Xuzhou Metro Line 3 (Phase 2) and Xuzhou Metro Line 6 started to construct.

According to Xuzhou Metro Group, the Xuzhou Metro Line 4 and Xuzhou Metro Line 5 will be constructed in 2022 and finished before 2026. In the future, Xuzhou Metro System will include at least 11 Subway lines: Xuzhou Metro Line 7, Xuzhou Metro Line S1, Xuzhou Metro Line S2, Xuzhou Metro Line S3, Xuzhou Metro Line S4, Xuzhou Metro Line S5, Xuzhou Metro Line 1 (Phase 2), Xuzhou Metro Line 2 (Phase 2), Xuzhou Metro Line 5 & 6 (Phase 2 & 3) etc.

Others 
The Grand Canal flows through Xuzhou, and the navigation route extends from Jining to Hangzhou.

Luning oil pipeline, which originates from Linyi county of Shandong to Nanjing, passes through Xuzhou.

Military 
Xuzhou is headquarters of the 12th Group Army of the People's Liberation Army, one of the three group armies that compose the Nanjing Military Region responsible for the defense of China's eastern coast and possible military engagement with Taiwan. The People's Liberation Army Navy also has a Type 054A frigate that shares the name of the region.

See also
 Battle of Xuzhou
 List of cities in the People's Republic of China by population
 List of twin towns and sister cities in China
 Xuzhou dialect
 Sex trafficking in China

Citations

General references

External links 

 Government website of Xuzhou (in Simplified Chinese)
 Xuzhou city guide with open directory (Jiangsu.NET)

 
Cities in Jiangsu
Port cities and towns in China
Prefecture-level divisions of Jiangsu